Noelle Rose Andressen, is an American professional contemporary ballet dancer and choreographer who broke her silence about being sexually abused by creating her dance piece: “Red Ribbons”. Andressen has danced and choreographed for over 25 years with over 75 choreographic works that combined her Emmy nominated arts and skills to form her professional dance company Rubans Rouges Dance and produces events on both coasts in New York City and Los Angeles. She's also the art director and producer for the annual international “Awakenings & Beginnings International Dance Festival." This festival presents international artists, as well as works from new emerging artists and established choreographers in a community effort to unite the Los Angeles dance arts.

History 
Andressen was nominated for performing artist of the year in 2012 with a section from Red Ribbons called Coeur de Verre. Her choreography has been considered for Emmys. She's very active in supporting women's and children's rights and the prevention of their abuse. She has performed for the G.L.A.A.D. Awards, ABC's Modern Family, and renowned dance festivals globally.
Noelle Rose Andressen is also an actress under SAG-AFTRA and an Emmy Nominated Writer-Producer who is known for various film works: Baby Doe's Heartbeat (2004), Profile (2008), Beauty from Ashes (2007), Without Him...Entropy (2013)

In the fall of 2018 Noelle Rose made the cover of Lois Greenfield's Dance Weingarten Calendar and featured for the month of January.

Rubans Rouges Dance 
In 2008, Andressen founded the contemporary ballet dance company Rubans Rouges Dance (French translation: Red Ribbons). The company performs internationally, presenting dance drama utilizing multimedia. It is a healing arts performance company that also entertains.
She is the artistic director and lead female dancer for Rubans Rouges Dance in which she celebrates 10 years in 2019 as both classifications as the dance company also celebrates its 10th year with Tour Ten.

Mission 
Andressen is a breast cancer survivor.  She travels and gives encouraging speeches coupled with her dancing and choreography to empower women and help them overcome sexual abuse,  stand up for equal rights, learn to navigate the effects of cancer and be encouraged. She bases these dances on her true life experiences and performs them in dance concerts and tours with her company. She is referred to as a “Dance Warrior” with fiery red hair as her trademark. In the past she has stood up to any workplace sexual harassment and has proven to be a leader to help other women find their strength and speak up.  She has also created dance pieces about this incident as well. Additionally, she is a prolific author that uses her true life experiences laced with dance metaphors to express the human condition. DanceWarrior - From Cancer to Dancer (2016), DanceWarrior - Red Ribbons Shattered Innocence (2017), DanceWarrior Inspirations - The Strength of a Rose (2018).

Media

Articles 
Noelle has been featured in several different articles.
Associated Press
LAWeekly 
Celebrate Woman Today, 
Romper, 
CONTEMPORARY DANCE COMPANIES USA
The Roundup
The Weekend Go Go

Magazines 
She has also been featured in articles in many newspapers and magazines such as
Millennial Mom, 
The Roundup,
Valley Star

Broadcasts 
She has also been featured in many audio broadcasts such as
Stand Out Women
Millennial Mom
The Daily Author at The Wooden Pants Network

Works

Choreography 
Red Ribbons  Rubans *Rouges Dance performed the full edition of their repertory piece Red Ribbons, at a self-produced show called Red Ribbons and Memories. It was later further lengthened into a full two act dance-drama and musical production with dance, drama, music, singing, and theater which included the sections "Shattered Innocence" and "STORM!" Red Ribbons the dance and film "debuted in 2018 at the Ailey Citigroup Theater in Manhattan, New York City off Broadway in which Noelle Rose continued in the principal role dancing and singing.
The Silent Rose
Coeur de Verre 
Fight for Love

Films 
Actress, Baby Doe’s Heartbeat, Encopa Productions, 2004
Actress/Dancer, Beauty from Ashes, Encopa Productions, 2007
Actress/Dancer, Profile, Encopa Productions, 2008
Dancer, Without Him, Entropy, 2013

Books 
Dance Warrior - From Cancer to Dancer 
Dance Warrior - Red Ribbons (Shattered Innocence)
Dance Warrior Inspirations Strength of a Rose

Performances 
Andressen has performed her pieces at
“UNITY” Five Year Anniversary Show & Celebration
San Pedro Tri-Arts Festival
HHII Dance Festival
Choreographer's Showcase
So-Cal Dance Invitational
UCLA 2016 Season of Performing Arts
SFMAF

Productions

Awakenings and Beginnings Dance Festival 
Awakenings and Beginnings Dance Festival 2016
Awakenings and Beginnings Dance Festival 2017'''

Summer Showcases 
Summer Showcase 1: Red Ribbons and Memories

References

External links 
 Rubans Rouges Dance website
 Rubans Rouges Dance Channel on Youtube

Year of birth missing (living people)
Living people
American ballerinas
American choreographers
21st-century American women